Renato Alves Gomides (born 12 May 1984 in Goias) is a Brazilian football player. He currently plays for NK Široki Brijeg in Široki Brijeg, Bosnia and Herzegovina.

External links
 Brazilian FA Database
 Profile at HNS statistika

1984 births
Living people
Brazilian footballers
Association football defenders
NK Široki Brijeg players
Expatriate footballers in Bosnia and Herzegovina
NK Inter Zaprešić players
Sportspeople from Goiás
NK Hrvatski Dragovoljac players
NK Imotski players